The 2020 Puerto Rico House of Representative election was held on November 3, 2020, to elect the members of the 31st House of Representatives of Puerto Rico, concurrently with the election of the Governor, the Resident Commissioner, the Senate, and the mayors of the 78 municipalities. The winners were elected to a four-year term from January 3, 2021, to January 3, 2025.

The New Progressive Party lost their 2/3 majority, and the Popular Democratic Party narrowly surpassed the 26 seat threshold, and acquired the 1/2 majority. The Puerto Rican Independence Party retained their seat, while the Citizen's Victory Movement and Project Dignity gained 2 and 1 seat respectively.

Summary 
There are 172 candidates running for representative:

 New Progressive Party (PNP) have  46 candidates, 30 of which are incumbent.

 Popular Democratic Party (PPD) have 46  candidates, 11 of which are incumbent.

 Puerto Rican Independence Party (PIP) have  41 candidates, 1 of which is incumbent.

 Citizen’s Victory Movement (MVC) have 28 candidates.

 Project Dignity (PD) have 8 candidates.

 3 candidates are independent.

House of Representatives Composition

30th House of Representatives (2017-2021)

31st House of Representatives (2021-2025)

Results

Summary 

|-
|colspan=15 align=center|
|- style="background-color:#E9E9E9"
! rowspan="2" colspan="2" style="text-align:center;" | Parties
! style="text-align:center;" colspan="3" | District
! style="text-align:center;" colspan="3" | At-large
! rowspan="2" style="text-align:center;" colspan="1" | Total seats
! rowspan="2" style="text-align:center;" colspan="1" | Composition
! rowspan="2" style="text-align:center;" colspan="1" | ±
|- style="background-color:#E9E9E9"
! style="text-align:center;" | Votes
! style="text-align:center;" | %
! style="text-align:center;" | Seats
! style="text-align:center;" | Votes
! style="text-align:center;" | %
! style="text-align:center;" | Seats
|- style="text-align:right;"
| bgcolor=#cc0033|
| style="text-align:left;" | Popular Democratic Party (PPD)
| 436,522
| 39.04%
| 24
| 414,283
| 35.84%
| 2
| 26
| 
|  10
|- style="text-align:right;"
| bgcolor=#0000cc width=3 |
| style="text-align:left;" | New Progressive Party (PNP)
| 435,930
| 38.99%
| 16
| 387,934
| 33.57%
| 5
| 21
| 
|  13
|- style="text-align:right;"
| bgcolor=#CFB53B |
| style="text-align:left;" | Citizen's Victory Movement (MVC)
| 125,489
| 11.22%
| 0
| 151,409
| 13.10%
| 2
| 2
| 
|  2
|- style="text-align:right;"
| bgcolor=#33cc66 |
| style="text-align:left;" | Puerto Rican Independence Party (PIP)
| 98,864
| 8.84%
| 0
| 122,973
| 10.64%
| 1
| 1
| 
| 
|- style="text-align:right;"
| bgcolor=#00B7EB |
| style="text-align:left;" | Project Dignity (PD)
| 18,264
| 1.63%
| 0
| 79,166
| 6.85%
| 1
| 1
| 
|  1
|- style="text-align:right;"
|  |
| style="text-align:left;" | Independents
| 3,059
| 0.27%
| 0
| 0
| 0
| 0
| 0
| 
| 
|- style="background-color=#0000cc;text-align:right;"
|-
|align=left colspan=2|Total
| 1,118,128
| 100.0
| 40
| 1,155,765
| 100.0
| 11
| 51
|
|
|}

At-large Representatives

District Representatives

Representative District 1

Representative District 2

Representative District 3

Representative District 4

Representative District 5

Representative District 6

Representative District 7

Representative District 8

Representative District 9

Representative District 10

Representative District 11

Representative District 12

Representative District 13

Representative District 14

Representative District 15

Representative District 16

Representative District 17

Representative District 18

Representative District 19

Representative District 20

Representative District 21

Representative District 22

Representative District 23

Representative District 24

Representative District 25

Representative District 26

Representative District 27

Representative District 28

Representative District 29

Representative District 30

Representative District 31

Representative District 32

Representative District 33

Representative District 34

Representative District 35

Representative District 36

Representative District 37

Representative District 38

Representative District 39

Representative District 40

References 

General elections in Puerto Rico
2020 in Puerto Rico
Puerto Rico
Election and referendum articles with incomplete results
November 2020 events in the United States
2020 Puerto Rico elections
Puerto Rico House